US Post Office-Port Chester is a historic post office building located at Port Chester in Westchester County, New York. It was designed by consulting architects Zoller and Muller for the Office of the Supervising Architect, built in 1932–1933, and was listed on the National Register of Historic Places in 1989. It is a one-story symmetrical building faced with brick and trimmed in limestone and granite in the Colonial Revival style. The front facade features a projecting central pavilion with a shallow portico composed of two pairs of limestone Corinthian columns echoed by Corinthian pilasters. The lobby features four large murals and nine lunettes, designed by Domenico Mortellito and installed in 1936.

It was listed on the National Register of Historic Places in 1989.

Gallery

See also
National Register of Historic Places listings in southern Westchester County, New York

References

Port Chester
Government buildings completed in 1933
Colonial Revival architecture in New York (state)
Buildings and structures in Westchester County, New York
Port Chester, New York
Treasury Relief Art Project
National Register of Historic Places in Westchester County, New York